Supreme Headquarters is used by some nations and alliances to refer to the physical location of their high command.

Europe
 Supreme Headquarters (Yugoslav Partisans), the headquarters of the Communist Yugoslavian Partisans 
 Supreme Headquarters Allied Expeditionary Force, the headquarters of the Commander of Allied forces in north-west Europe
 Supreme Headquarters Allied Powers Europe, the headquarters of the North Atlantic Treaty Organization

Fiction
 Supreme Headquarters, International Espionage and Law-Enforcement Division (S.H.I.E.L.D), in Marvel Comics